The Westhope–Coulter Border Crossing connects the towns of Westhope, North Dakota and Melita, Manitoba on the Canada–United States border. U.S. Route 83 on the American side joins Manitoba Highway 83 on the Canadian side.

Canadian side
A.M. Reekie was the inaugural customs officer 1900–1916. Under the administrative oversight of the Port of Brandon, the office handled goods received by road. Inconveniently located and vulnerable to smuggling, the office moved to the border in 1930, adopting the name of Coulter, the nearest post office. That year, a combined residence/office was erected.

The building was replaced in 1947, then in 2014.

In 2020, the former border hours of 8am–9pm reduced, becoming 8am–4pm.

US side

The US first built a permanent inspection station at the border in 1937. That brick veneer roadside border station was replaced by a new building in the 1974, which in turn was replaced by a large modern border station in 2011.

See also
 List of Canada–United States border crossings

References 

Canada–United States border crossings
1930 establishments in Manitoba
1931 establishments in North Dakota
Buildings and structures in Bottineau County, North Dakota
Transportation in Bottineau County, North Dakota